Edward Pinkney may refer to:

 Edward Coote Pinkney (1802–1828), American poet
 Edward Pinkney, founder of the Black Autonomy Network Community Organization